Henry Clarke Wright (August 29, 1797 – August 16, 1870) was an American abolitionist, pacifist, anarchist and feminist, for over two decades a controversial figure.

Early life
Clarke was born in Sharon, Connecticut, to father Seth Wright, a farmer and house-joiner (builder), and mother Miriam, a stay-at-home seamstress. When he was four, the family moved to the "western country" of Hartwick; it was a small, poor town, on the frontier in upstate New York.

Working as an apprentice to a hat-maker in Norwich, New York, Wright experienced an emotional religious conversion during a revival meeting. He went on to study first under the local minister, and then at the Andover Theological Seminary in 1819 for four years. In 1823 he married a wealthy widow by the name of Elizabeth LeBreton Stickney, and moved to the upscale community of Newburyport, Massachusetts.

Missionary work
Elizabeth Wright's interest in reform movements preceded Henry's own. She influenced Wright's decision to turn away from the parish ministry and enter the field of missionary work and reform in the 1830s. By this time he had adopted radical positions on two issues that were breaking up evangelical consensus. In the peace movement, he sided with radical pacifists who promoted an ethic of non-violence in all forms of conflict. Consequently, in 1836 he was appointed an agent of the American Peace Society. On anti-slavery, he sided with William Lloyd Garrison, promoting immediate abolition.
 
On resigning from the American Peace Society, Wright was employed by Garrison and the American Anti-Slavery Society.  He wrote columns for Garrison's newspaper, The Liberator, and gained respect among Northerners for moral beliefs contained within his call for non-violent immediate abolition. He also had special responsibility for organizing children's anti-slavery movements in towns across the Northeast.

Later, his Newburyport home served as headquarters in summer 1837 for Angelina Grimké and Sarah Grimké when they began to create controversy over women speaking in public on behalf of the slaves. Wright was accused of encouraging the Grimkés to take too bold a stand on a woman's public role.  He published two accounts of conversations he had with the Grimkés about extending his radical pacifist views to question all forms of domination in the family. At times he challenged whether coercive civil government was consistent with Christian faith. Critics of abolitionism used Wright as an example of the anarchy let loose by immoderate abolitionist attacks on traditional institutions. In September 1837 he was fired from the American Anti-Slavery Society for his radical views.

Support for women's rights
At a large meeting in Boston's Melodeon Hall on May 30, 1850, Wright was the first of four male speakers to endorse Lucy Stone's proposal to call the first National Woman's Rights Convention. However, he did not attend any of the National Woman's Rights Conventions until 1859, when he introduced resolutions concerning married women's sexual rights. Wright was one of a few men who published books in the mid-nineteenth century advocating the wife's control of marital relations, his first being   Marriage and Parentage; Or, The Reproductive Element in Man, as a Means to His Elevation and Happiness, published in 1854, and his second,  The Unwelcome Child; Or, The Crime of an Undesigned and Undesired Child, published in 1858. Both books promoted sexual responsibility within marriage and argued that because women bore the consequences of the sexual act, wives should have the right to decline sexual relations.

In speeches during the summer of 1865, Wright was also an advocate of woman suffrage, and immediately after the Civil War was one of the early advocates of "universal suffrage," – extending the vote "without regard to color or to sex."

Natick Resolution essay
Wright is perhaps most famous for his radical Natick Resolution essay delivered to an audience in Natick, Massachusetts in December 1859, stemming from an earlier speech delivered in May 1857 in front of the American Anti-Slavery Society.  Still claiming to be faithful to non-resistance, Wright argued to the Society that true abolitionists should furnish arms for slave insurrection.  Later, in his revised speech delivered in Natick, entitled Resistance to Slaveholders & the Right and Duty of Southern Slaves and Northern Freemen, Wright argues

That it is the right and duty of the slaves to resist their masters, and the right and duty of the people of the North to incite them to resistance, and to aid them in it.

This militant antislavery article was published prior to John Brown's execution in December 1859 in order to provoke support for the immediate abolitionist cause.  Wright's rhetoric calls for complete resistance, in every form, to the institution of slavery. To him, John Brown symbolized the courage of such resistance. At one point, Wright compares Brown to Christ and finds Brown superior, writing

The sin of this nation, as it was asserted in that meeting, is to be taken away, not by Christ, but by John Brown. Christ, as represented by those who are called by his name, has proved a dead failure, as a power to free the slaves. John Brown is and will be a power far more efficient.

The Natick Resolution was well-recognized immediately prior to the American Civil War as a leading document of militant abolitionism. Clarke's former associates in the pacifist movement claimed he had abandoned his principles of non-violence.

Henry Clarke Wright's radical notions and writings had a profound effect on abolitionism and the society in which he lived.  After his militant writings, he spent the rest of his life as a freelance author and lecturer throughout the Midwest.  Wright died in Pawtucket, Rhode Island in 1870.  A beautiful monument was erected in his honor by abolitionist Photius Fisk.  The monument is at Swan Point Cemetery, Providence, Rhode Island, and was erected in 1870.

Meeting with Henry Thoreau
An irritated Henry Thoreau describes in his journal a visit of Wright to Concord and the Thoreau home in June 1853. He wrote, in part:I was awfully pestered with his benignity; feared I should get greased all over with it past restoration...  [He] addressed me as "Henry" within one minute from the time I first laid eyes on him, and when I spoke, he said with drawling, sultry sympathy, "Henry, I know all you would say; I understand you perfectly; you need not explain anything to me;" and to another, "I am going to dive into Henry's innermost depths." I said, "I trust you will not strike your head against the bottom.William Ellery Channing explained this reaction by characterizing reformer Wright as among "the travelling conversational Shylocks ... each the special savior on his own responsibility".

References

Further reading
 Burnham, John C.; JSTOR
 Church History > Vol. 51, No. 3 (Sep., 1982), p. 359
 The Journal of American History, Vol. 67, No. 3 (Dec., 1980), pp. 680–681
 https://www.jstor.org/stable/1889906
 Million, Joelle, Woman's Voice, Woman's Place: Lucy Stone and the Birth of the Women's Rights Movement. Praeger, 2003. , pp. 47, 79, 104, 193, 203, 207, 252, 273, 289n. 4, 290n. 9, 303n. 8.
 The Natick Resolution  described at Antislavery
 Perry, Lewis; Childhood, Marriage, and Reform Henry Clarke Wright, 1797-1870
 Wright, Henry Clarke (29 Aug. 1797-16 Aug. 1870), Abolitionists, Congregational Clergy, Pacifists, 1375 words, from The American National Biography Online
 Wright, Henry C.,   Marriage and Parentage; Or, The Reproductive Element in Man, as a Means to His Elevation and Happiness, 2d ed., 1854.
 Wright, Henry C.,  The Unwelcome Child; Or, The Crime of an Undesigned and Undesired Child, Boston: B. Marsh, 1858.

1797 births
1870 deaths
Activists from New York (state)
American abolitionists
American anarchists
American Christian pacifists
American suffragists
Anarcha-feminists
Anarcho-pacifists
Christian abolitionists
Christian anarchists
Individualist anarchists
People from Hartwick, New York
People from Newburyport, Massachusetts
People from Norwich, New York
People from Sharon, Connecticut